This is a list of Presidents of the Prussian State Council from 1817 to 1933 in the Landtag of the Kingdom of Prussia and the Free State of Prussia.

Presidents of the Prussian State Council (Kingdom of Prussia)
The presidents of the royal Prussian State Council were the heads of the government.

Presidents of the Prussian State Council (Free State of Prussia)
The presidents of the republican Prussian State Council were the head of the second chamber of the state parliament, staffed by representatives of the provinces of Prussia. On 18 May 1933 the state council ceded its participation in legislation to the Nazi Reich's government by voting for the Prussian empowerment Act. On 8 July 1933 the new Law on the State Council abolished it as an elected body and converted into a council of Nazi party favorites chosen by Göring's state government.

Footnotes and references

Political history of Germany
Prussia
Presidents of the Prussian State Council